Apterodromites saizi is a species of beetle in the family Carabidae, the only species in the genus Apterodromites.

References

Lebiinae